Ferkessedougou Airport is an airport serving Ferkessedougou in Côte d'Ivoire.

Airports in Ivory Coast
Buildings and structures in Savanes District
Tchologo